"Inside Out" is the debut single by American alternative rock band Eve 6, released in May 1998 from their self-titled debut album. The song was a big hit in North America, managing to top the US Billboard Modern Rock Tracks chart three times, totaling four weeks at number one. It also reached number 28 on the Billboard Hot 100, number 36 on Canada's RPM Top Singles chart and number 24 in Iceland.

Content
"We were 16 and 17 years old when we wrote Eve 6, and it sounds like it,” said singer Max Collins in 2018. "For that whole record, I was pretty much writing it at this one girl who cheated on me and broke my heart," he said. "My muse would have been that relationship and that girl, and not really having the emotional equipment to know how to deal with it."

Track listings and formats
AUS / EU Maxi CD Single
"Inside Out"  – 3:39
"Showerhead"  – 3:04
"Saturday Night"  – 2:51

EU 7" Vinyl
"Inside Out"  – 3:39
"Showerhead"  – 3:04

Charts

In popular culture
The song is a downloadable track for Rock Band.

In December 2020, Eve 6's official Twitter account became the subject of media attention as "a trove of internet comedy" owing, in part, to its querying of various public figures as to whether they "like the heart in a blender song” (referring to the most well-known lyric of "Inside Out").

See also
List of number-one alternative singles of the 1990s (U.S.)

References

External links

1998 songs
1998 debut singles
Eve 6 songs
Songs written by Max Collins (musician)
RCA Records singles